On Telecoms was a Greek telecommunications company offering triple play, double play  and fixed telephony services in Athens and Thessaloniki through Local Loop Unbundling.

The company was founded in March 2006 and started its commercial operations in January 2007. In November 2009 the company expanded in Thessaloniki. In October 2009 it acquired Vivodi Telecom and achieved the operational integration of the two companies within a few months.
On Telecoms offered a range of telephony, internet and digital TV (IPTV) services for residential customers, small businesses and enterprises.

On 30 June 2015 On Telecoms ceased all services and its IP addresses returned to the RIPE NCC's free pool.

Management Team 
The company's management team consisted of some telecoms executives of the Greek market:
 Gregoris Anastasiadis – Managing Director
 Gregoris Tsougrianis - Business Development & Customer Services Director
 John Lousidis – Sales Director
 George Mavrokoukoulakis - ΙΤ Director
 Niki Papageorgiou - Finance Director

Board of directors
 Andreas Rialas - Chairman
 Gregoris Anastasiadis – Managing Director
 Tassos Kazinos – Vice Chairman
 Marios Stellakis – Member
 George Stathopoulos – Member
 Loukas Dimitriou – Member

You Are One 
In July 2010, On Telecoms launched You Are One, a new service that allowed its website visitors to build a tailored program and buy it on-line.

Support 
The company's main support channel was 13801, which was available 365 days a year and could provide support regarding technical issues, billing information and other customer service issues.

Infrastructure
On Telecoms had deployed a backbone network, based entirely on IP/MPLS (Internet Protocol), using up to 10 Gbit/s bandwidth interconnection.

Broadband development
As part of its investment plan, the company had completed the “On Telecoms broadband development” project. The project included:
 Head - End Live TV development.
 Video On Demand development.
 Provision and installation of decoders (Set Top Boxes).
 Development of a multimedia digital library (movies, theater).
The project was included in the action "Funding of private-sector companies for the development of broadband access in the Regional Areas of Greece” of Information Society S.A. that has been included in the Operational Program Information Society (O.P.I.S.) of the 3rd Community Support Framework. The project’s budget was 4.9 million euro, of which 50% was public expenditure. The expenditure was 80% funded by the European Regional Development Fund and 20% by the Greek Government. The action aimed to increase the availability of new innovative broadband services.

See also
 Internet in Greece

References

External links
www.on.gr Official website in Greek and English

Internet service providers of Greece
Chalandri